Dimitrios I. Roussopoulos (born 1936) is a Canadian political activist and publisher.

Early life
Roussopoulos studied philosophy, politics, and economics at several Montreal and London universities. He has remained institutionally independent apart from teaching two years in the late 1960s at a progressive college.

Career
Roussopoulos’s peace activism began in 1959 when he founded the Combined Universities Campaign for Nuclear Disarmament and organized the first post-war student demonstration in Ottawa. He founded and edited Canada’s first quarterly peace research journal, Our Generation, in 1961. Its first issue gained a circulation of three thousand and carried a preface by Bertrand Russell.

In 1969, Roussopoulos founded Black Rose Books, an international publishing house known for publishing works of left-wing politics by Noam Chomsky and Murray Bookchin, among others. In a recent interview, Roussopoulos stated that the mission of the publishing house was threefold: to disseminate ideas of participatory democracy and community organizing, to publish the best radical analysis of Canadian society, to revive libertarian socialist literature long suppressed on the left.

Since the 1970s, Roussopoulos has been active in radical municipalist community organizing in Montreal. He helped found the Milton-Park Citizens’ Committee and contributed to a decade-long effort to prevent the destruction of a heritage six-city-block neighbourhood. The area was transformed into the largest non-profit cooperative housing project in North America, with some 1200 residents federated into 22 co-ops and non-profit housing associations on the first land trust in Canada, preventing all land speculation. Roussopoulos was a president of the University Settlement of Montreal, which sought to democratize and localize the neighbourhood economy and successfully launched a credit union, library, and rooftop garden.

Roussopoulos was also an active member of the Montreal Citizens Movement from 1975 to 1978, in which he advocated for the democratic decentralization of City Hall's political power into decision-making Montreal neighbourhood councils.

To advance principles of social ecology, Roussopoulos founded Ecology Montreal in 1989, the first municipal green party in North America. With Serge Mongeau and Jacques Gelinas, Roussopoulos co-founded Les Editions Eco-Société in 1992. He founded the Montreal Urban Ecology Center, alongside fellow activist (and Roussopoulos’ life partner) Lucia Kowaluk in the mid-1990s. From 2001 to 2012, Dimitri Roussopoulos headed the Taskforce on Municipal Democracy of the City of Montreal, which proposed and drafted the Montreal Charter of Citizen Rights and Responsibilities, the first right-to-the-city charter in North America, which was later recognized by UNESCO. The Taskforce then adopted the first citizens' initiative for public consultation whereby petitioning citizens can obtain public consultations on issues on a wide range of public policy issues, a first in North America. Roussopoulos additionally organize five citizen summits (2001-2010) for bottom-up democracy, drawing together one thousand citizens and non-governmental organizations to advance a citizens' agenda for change.

With the World Social Forum, Roussopoulos continues to advance extra-parliamentary opposition in Canada and bottom-up democracy in the tradition of Murray Bookchin's social ecology. In 2012, he founded the Transnational Institute of Social Ecology, an Athens-based network of intellectuals and activists working in various cities in Europe.

In 2018, he co-curated the exhibition Milton-Parc: How We Did It, presented at the Canadian Centre for Architecture from September 2018 to March 2019. Currently, he serves as president of Communauté Saint-Urbain, a community project aiming to redevelop the heritage site Hôtel-Dieu de Montréal such that the site preserves its important status in the community, while attending to the needs of local residents.

Bibliography

English
 The Case for Participatory Democracy, co-edited with C. George Benello, 1970
 The New Left in Canada, edited by Dimitri Roussopoulos, 1970
 Political Economy of the State – Canada, Quebec, United States, edited by Dimitri Roussopoulos, 1973
 Canada and Radical Social Change, edited by Dimitri Roussopoulos, 1973
 Quebec and Radical Social Change, edited by Dimitri Roussopoulos, 1974
 City and Radical Social Change, edited by Dimitri Roussopoulos, 1982
 Our Generation against Nuclear War, edited by Dimitri Roussopoulos, 1983
 1984 and After, co-edited Marsha Hewitt, 1984
 Coming of World War Three, 1986
 Radical Papers, 1986, Radical Papers 2, 1987, edited by Dimitri Roussopoulos
 Anarchist Papers, 2001; Anarchist Papers 2, 1989; Anarchist Papers 3, 1990 edited by Dimitri Roussopoulos
 Dissidence – Essays against the Mainstream, 1992
 Political Ecology; Beyond Environmentalism, 1993
 Public Place – Citizen Participation in the Neighbourhood and the City,  1999
 The New Left – Legacy and Continuity, edited by Dimitri Roussopoulos, 2007
 Faith in Faithlessness – An Anthology of Atheism, edited by Dimitri Roussopoulos, 2008
 The Rise of Cities, edited by and written by Dimitri Roussopoulos, 2012
 Villages in Cities: Community Land Ownership, Cooperative Housing, and the Milton Park Story, co-edited with Joshua Hawley, 2019

French
L’écologie politique – Au-delà de l’environnementalisme, 1994
Au bout de l’Impasse à gauche – récits de vie militant et perspectives d’avenir, 2007

Further reading

 1968 Memories and Legacies of a Global Revolt, edited by Phillipp Gassert & Martin Klimke, German Historical Institute, Washington, D.C. 2009
 Canada's 1960s by Bryan D. Palmer, University of Toronto Press, Toronto, 2009
 The Canadian Encyclopedia, Hurtig Publishers, Edmonton, 1988
 The Empire Within by Sean Mills, McGill-Queen's University Press, Montreal, 2010
 Keeping to the Marketplace by John C.Bacher, McGill-Queen's University Press, Montreal, 1993
 Left, Left, Left: Personal Account of Six Protest Campaigns, 1945-65 by Peggy Duff, Allison & Busby, London, 1971, 
 The Milton-Park Affair – Canada’s Largest Citizen-Developer Confrontation by Claire Helman, Véhicule Press, Montreal, 1987
 Spying 101 – The RCMP's Secret Activities at Canadian Universities, 1917-1997, Steve Hewitt, University of Toronto Press, Toronto, 2002
 Saillant, Francois, Lutter pour un Toit, Ecosociete, 2018.

See also
 Montréal Écologique

References

External links
Black Rose Books
Transnational Institute of Social Ecology
Peace magazine article by Dimitrios Roussopoulos
Reflections on the Occasion of Dimitri Roussopoulos’ 70th Birthday and Public Intellectuals

Anarcho-communists
Canadian publishers (people)
Quebec municipal politicians
Canadian people of Greek descent
Canadian environmentalists
Canadian anti–nuclear weapons activists
Activists from Montreal
Canadian anarchists
Living people
1936 births